Callilepis is a genus of flowering plants in the family Asteraceae. It is native to southern Africa.

 Species

 Callilepis caerulea – ox-eye daisy – Soutpansberg, Limpopo
 Callilepis lancifolia – Limpopo
 Callilepis laureola – ox-eye daisy, black-eyed susan, marguerite  – Limpopo, KwaZulu-Natal, Free State, Swaziland, Cape Province
 Callilepis leptophylla – wild daisy – Limpopo, KwaZulu-Natal, Swaziland
 Callilepis salicifolia –  Limpopo, KwaZulu-Natal, Swaziland

References

Asteroideae
Asteraceae genera